"Past Lives" is a comic book storyline based on the Buffy the Vampire Slayer television series and published in Buffy the Vampire Slayer #29–30 and Angel #15–16. It was later reprinted as a trade paperback collected edition.

Story description

Angel #15

Comic title: Past Lives, part 1 

A huntress is tracking demons in L.A. This would normally seem to be a good thing, except that she's started leaving survivors to tell them that Angel sent her. As a result, Angel has a huge horde of demons trying to track him for revenge. His human friends, Cordelia and Wesley will soon no longer be safe, unless Angel can do something.

Buffy the Vampire Slayer #29

Comic title: Past Lives, part 2 

Cordelia and Wesley are in hospital whilst Angel is on the run. A mysterious demon hunter continues her actions against Angel. Demons are leaving carnage across L.A. and some are seeking refuge in Sunnydale. Buffy, Giles, and the others learn about recent chaos, and Buffy believes she should go to help Angel in L.A. Riley is displeased with such developments.

Angel #16

Comic title: Past Lives, part 3 

Angel confronts the mysterious demon hunter who's out to get him, but he barely escapes alive. Meanwhile, Buffy and Giles begin to find out who and what is behind the recent activity against Angel. The key players begin to gather in LA (including some people from Sunnydale), and the stage is setting for a confrontation.

Buffy the Vampire Slayer #30

Comic title: Past Lives, part 4

Giles and Angel reveal their involvement with the demon-hunter in the past; Giles dated the hunter for a time and Angel drove her ancestor insane when he was Angelus. Buffy and her friends try to stop her, culminating in a final confrontation against the hunter.

Continuity

Supposed to be set in Buffy season 4, after Superstar

Canonical issues

Buffy/Angel comics such as this one are not usually considered by fans as canonical. Some fans consider them stories from the imaginations of authors and artists, while other fans consider them as taking place in an alternative fictional reality. However unlike fan fiction, overviews summarising their story, written early in the writing process, were 'approved' by both Fox and Joss Whedon (or his office), and the books were therefore later published as officially Buffy merchandise.

Buffyverse comic book crossovers
Angel (1999 TV series)